Portrait of Princess Maria Christina is an oil-on-canvas painting executed c. 1790 by Élisabeth Vigée Le Brun. It was commissioned by Maria Christina's parents Maria Carolina of Austria and Ferdinand I of the Two Sicilies. Vigée Le Brun had taken refuge in Naples after fleeing Paris in 1789 during the French Revolution.

The portrait is now in the National Museum of Capodimonte in Naples.

References

1790s paintings
Paintings by Élisabeth Vigée Le Brun
Paintings in the collection of the Museo di Capodimonte
Children in art